Tamiz Uddin Rizvi (died 7 May 2022) was a Bangladeshi freedom fighter ( deputy commander mujib bahini ) and film director & Producer. He directed many films.

Biography
Rizvi took part in the Liberation War of Bangladesh. He was the director of Ashirbad. Anju Ghosh made her career debut with that film. This film is selected for preservation in Bangladesh Film Archive.

Rizvi was the director of Asha Valobasa too. In this film Misha Sawdagar acted in negative role for the first time in his career. This film is also selected for preservation in Bangladesh Film Archive.

Besides these films Rizvi also directed films like Chhoto Ma, Jeler Meye and Jobabdihi. These films are selected for preservation  in Bangladesh Film Archive too. His last direction Jobabdihi was released in 1999.

Selected filmography
 Ashirbad
Choto Maa
Jeler Meye
Tumi Amar
 Asha Valobasa
 Jobabdihi

References

1940s births
2022 deaths
Bangladeshi film directors
People from Narayanganj District
Year of birth uncertain